Silvermane (Silvio Manfredi) is a supervillain appearing in American comic books published by Marvel Comics. A notorious crime boss and prominent figure in the Maggia, a fictional organized crime syndicate, he is usually depicted as an adversary of the superhero Spider-Man and the father of Joseph Manfredi. Silvermane later became a cyborg in an attempt to extend his lifespan.

The character has made appearances in several forms of media outside of comics, including animated series and video games.

Publication history
He first appeared in The Amazing Spider-Man #73 and was created by Stan Lee and John Buscema.

The character's original storyline was about a mysterious stone tablet coveted by several Spider-Man villains. The "Tablet Saga" proved popular, although artist John Romita, Sr. said that it was not originally intended as an arc: "We never even thought up Silvermane until the seventh issue [of the story arc], let alone a 'socko' ending."

Fictional character biography
Silvio Manfredi, nicknamed "Silvermane" for his near-white hair, is a professional criminal originally from Corleone, Sicily that started his criminal career as a racketeer in the Maggia, eventually forming his own crime family and becoming a powerful Maggia Don.

In his first appearance, an elderly Silvermane forced Curt Connors to make a potion from an ancient clay tablet to grant himself immortality. He first crossed paths with Connors' alter-ego, the Lizard, and Spider-Man during this scheme. Drinking the serum made Silvermane younger, but its effects caused him to de-age further and further until he was an infant before completely disappearing. Silvermane eventually reappeared, revealing that he had mystically aged to his forties. He started a new career and again quickly rose through the Maggia's ranks until he regained control of his family, the sought to form an alliance with Hydra, determined to take over the world as their leader, the Supreme Hydra. He was defeated by Daredevil, Nick Fury and S.H.I.E.L.D. Silvermane reappeared in New York in an attempt to unite all of New York's gangs under his leadership and take over the criminal underworld, but his plans were complicated by the Green Goblin, who opposed him. During a confrontation between the Goblin, Silvermane and Spider-Man, Silvermane fell from a great height but survived.

Silvermane has worked with many super-villains, such as Hammerhead, and he has also been known to be a rival of the Kingpin, even once trying to assassinate the crime lord while he was suffering from amnesia. His former partner, Dominic Tyrone, assumed the identity of the Rapier and sought vengeance against Silvermane for betraying him by attempting to take his life. A flashback one-shot focused heavily on Silvermane's lifetime of corruption and crime, going back to his early career in Italy. The framework was reporter Ben Urich investigating the background of the Maggia. He learned that Silvermane was a legendary criminal figure for decades; mothers would even warn their children to behave or "One-Eye" would get them.

In his old age, Silvermane's injuries caused his youth serum to wear off, rendering him an invalid. Though bedridden, he continued to run his criminal empire until Dagger nearly killed him. Silvermane attempted to prolong his life by transforming himself into a cyborg. Kingpin gained control of his cyborg body until Dagger restored his life energy to him. His cyborg body was badly damaged by the first Jack O'Lantern during a gang war between Hammerhead and the Kingpin. Silvermane used a remote-controlled android doppelganger to battle Spider-Man. This was part of an attempt to boost the power of his remaining organic parts by harvesting new ones from Spider-Man's body. He attempted to drain his nemesis's radioactive blood to power a new, much stronger cyborg body. Silvermane also confronted Deathlok and the Punisher while setting up a major drug operation outside a grammar school. Even though he is no longer technically human, he has continued to remain active in the Maggia.

Silvermane attempted to take part in a meetup of various criminal warlords, during a time when Wilson Fisk had fallen from power. The meeting's goal was to divide up Fisk's territory and assets, but it did not go well. Silvermane was caught in the crossfire between the Secret Empire's forces and the Punisher. This was purely by coincidence as he was simply staying at the same motel as Punisher was. Silvermane used the resources of his personal semi-trailer and the cyborg bodies stored within to battle his way through the attackers and escape.

It was revealed some time later that Silvermane was killed during a shootout with Owl's gang at a New York City scrap yard. He was picked up by a magnet and dropped into a garbage compactor, crushing him to death and leaving his already weakened criminal syndicate without a leader. Months later, he apparently returns along with other deceased members of his gang during the Maggia's losing battle with the forces of Mister Negative. However, this is later revealed to be a ruse orchestrated by a mobster named Carmine: "Silvermane" is actually a lifelike robotic duplicate controlled by a hired Mysterio to give Carmine more influence within the Maggia and position him to take over. The tables are turned on Carmine when Mysterio uses the duplicate to murder him, seemingly as a plot to take over the Maggia himself.

Silvermane's head is shown to still be alive as it was found by a young boy when he traveled into the scrap yard, before then being stolen by the Shocker. The head is used as leverage by The Superior Foes of Spider-Man to take control of the Maggia, but the team members turn on each other when it comes time to decide who will actually be in charge. Shocker protects Silvermane from the Punisher. In return, the crime boss nominates him as his successor to head the Maggia.

Silvermane is among the crime lords competing with Mister Negative in obtaining the Tablet of Life and Destiny to win the favor of Mayor Wilson Fisk.

Powers and abilities
Silvermane was considered to be one of the Maggia's most legendary bosses. He is an excellent unarmed combatant and marksman, as well as a brilliant planner, organizer, and strategist. The magic potions he uses temporarily grant him a form of immortality, appearing in his early-to-mid 40s. His preferred weapons are numerous machine guns, especially the Thompson .45 caliber. Later, Silvermane's brain, vital organs, and head were transplanted into a robotic body, thus increasing his physical attributes to abnormal levels. However, his remaining biological parts needs careful protection, because of their extreme vulnerability.

Other versions

Ultimate Marvel
The Ultimate Marvel version of Silvermane had a brief cameo. With Wilson Fisk lying low due to legal problems, Silvermane, his chief rival, decided to work with fellow mobster Hammerhead to remove the Kingpin from power. He told Hammerhead that all he needed was a little "up here" (referring to his intelligence). Hammerhead, however, wasn't interested in sharing power, breaking Silvermane's neck while saying "I think I got enough up here already." Silvermane was also mentioned as a leader of a mob family which included Hammerhead and that he owed a debt to Nathaniel Essex. The Ultimate incarnation's real name is shown in the Daily Bugle as Allan Silvermane, though this is likely an alias as he is also referred to as Silvio Manfredi.

House of M
Silvermane appeared in the House of M reality, portrayed as a younger crime boss and one of dozens of mobsters captured by the NYPD's elite Brotherhood unit.

In other media

Television

 Silvermane appears in Spider-Man (1981) episode "Wrath of the Sub-Mariner", voiced by Paul Winchell.
 Silvermane appears in Spider-Man: The Animated Series, voiced by Jeff Corey as an old man, Townsend Coleman as a young man, Matthew McCurley as a child, and Cannon Young as a baby. This version is an enemy of Spider-Man and the Kingpin, the latter of whom serves as his rival in New York's criminal underworld, and is the father of Alisa Silver (voiced by Leigh-Allyn Baker). Following minor appearances in the episodes "The Insidious Six" and "Battle of the Insidious Six", Silvermane spends the episodes "Tablet of Time" and "Ravages of Time" obsessively locating the titular tablet, an artifact capable of rejuvenating an individual's youth, so he can achieve immortality due to his irregular childhood. After locating it, he arranges for Tombstone to steal it, kidnap Dr. Curt Connors to decipher it, and take the scientist's family hostage to ensure his complicity. Though Spider-Man saves the Connorses and in spite of Dr. Connors' warning of the tablet's instability, Silvermane uses it to make himself a young man before he becomes a child and a baby while Hammerhead steals the Tablet on Kingpin's behalf. In the episode "Partners", due to being a baby despite retaining his adult intellect, Silvermane has Alisa help him persuade Alistair Smythe to kidnap the Black Cat and blackmail Spider-Man into apprehending the Scorpion so Silvermane can use neogenic technology to switch bodies with the web-slinger. During the procedure however, the Vulture interferes and takes Spider-Man's place, allowing the web-slinger, Black Cat, and Scorpion to escape. Following this, the Vulture becomes a young man while Silvermane returns to his original age.
 Silvermane appears in The Spectacular Spider-Man, voiced by Miguel Ferrer. This version is a rival crime lord to Tombstone and the father of Sable Manfredi who was arrested and jailed 12 years prior to the series after Frederick Foswell exposed his criminal activities to the FBI. Tombstone subsequently took Silvermane's territory while Sable ran his empire's remnants in her father's absence. In the episode "Gangland", Silvermane joins a summit between him, Tombstone, and Doctor Octopus. When the meeting goes sideways and Spider-Man gets involved, Silvermane uses a hidden hydraulic exoskeleton to combat the web-slinger and the other crime bosses, only to be defeated by Spider-Man and apprehended by the police. As of the episode "Opening Night", Silvermane was remanded to the Vault. Though he is released by the Green Goblin to kill Spider-Man while the web-slinger was there to test the prison's security system, Walter Hardy releases sleeping gas to subdue the prisoners.
 Silvermane appears in Spider-Man (2017), voiced by Nolan North. In his most notable appearance in the episode "Goblin War" Pt. 3, Silvermane became the leader of the Goblin Nation's Cyber Goblins before he is defeated by Spider-Man and the Hobgoblin.

Video games
 Silvermane appears in the SNES and Sega Genesis beta versions of Spider-Man (1995), but was replaced with a robot in the final versions.
 Silvermane appears in the Nintendo DS version of Spider-Man: Shattered Dimensions, voiced by Steve Blum. Having survived to the year 2099 due to his cybernetic body, he attempts to use a fragment of the Tablet of Order and Chaos to become immortal, only to be defeated by Spider-Man 2099.
 Silvermane appears as a playable character in Lego Marvel Super Heroes 2, as part of the "Cloak and Dagger" DLC.

Miscellaneous
Silvermane appears in the novel Spider-Man: Forever Young, written by Stefan Petrucha. The details of the tablet story are retold, with some elements being updated or changed, such as Silvermane displaying a disdain for personal electronic devices due to their lack of security as well as the Kingpin being left in a coma due to the shock of learning that his son was the masked criminal, the Schemer. The novel picks up two years after the original storyline, with Silvermane now fluctuating between being a child and adult as he attempts to force Curt Connors and Spider-Man to retrieve the tablet and stabilize his condition. Even after Connors's research asserts that the tablet essentially cycles someone through their reincarnations in one lifetime to try to achieve true karma, Silvermane refuses to accept this and attempts to blackmail Spider-Man to help him after deducing his true identity. Spider-Man eventually confronts Silvermane in the latter's church hideout. The ensuing battle ends with an enraged Silvermane burning the church down to try to kill Spider-Man, though his ultimate fate is left unclear.

References

External links
 Silvermane at Marvel.com

Characters created by John Buscema
Characters created by Stan Lee
Comics characters introduced in 1969
Fictional characters with immortality
Fictional characters with slowed ageing
Fictional characters with superhuman durability or invulnerability
Fictional characters with superhuman senses
Fictional crime bosses
Fictional Italian American people
Fictional Sicilian people
Hydra (comics) agents
Marvel Comics characters who can move at superhuman speeds
Marvel Comics characters with superhuman strength
Marvel Comics cyborgs
Marvel Comics male supervillains
Marvel Comics supervillains
Spider-Man characters
Villains in animated television series